James Fall may refer to:
 James Fall (politician), Scottish member of parliament for Haddington Burghs
 James Fall (priest), English Anglican priest
 Jim Fall, American film and television director and film producer